José Lai Hung-seng (born 14 January 1946, in Macau) is the Roman Catholic  Bishop Emeritus of Macau, the first born in the diocese and the second Chinese bishop, the first being Domingos Lam. Lai was appointed on 23 January 2001 Coadjutor and succeeded on 30 June 2003. He was succeeded by Bishop Stephen Lee Bun-sang on 23 January 2016.

Lai was born in Macau and attended St. Joseph's Seminary and Church before going to Portugal for further studies  at Diocesan Seminary of Leiria from 1967 to 1971 and to Grottaferrata.

References

1946 births
Living people
21st-century Roman Catholic bishops in Macau
20th-century Macau people